Bittenbender is an occupational surname for a cooper, an altered form of German Bittenbinder. It may refer to the following notable people:

Ada Bittenbender (1848–1925), American lawyer and feminist
Robert Bittenbender, American mixed media artist

See also
Bittenbender Covered Bridge, a historic bridge in Pennsylvania, U.S.

References

German-language surnames